Meghna Nair is an Indian actress who has appeared in Tamil and Malayalam films.

Career
Aged 18, Meghaa Nair first began shooting for Thangam (2008), portraying the role of the lead actress paired opposite Sathyaraj. She portrayed Sathyaraj's wife in the film, and wore make-up to present her beyond her real age. She subsequently featured in films including Pasupathi c/o Rasakkapalayam (2007) in Vivek's comedy track and Poova Thalaiya (2011) as a prostitute, before landing a role in Siva's Siruthai (2011) as a police officer. Siva had chosen her after being impressed with some promotional stills from her film Nellai Sandhippu (2012), and Megha's height was also a factor in convincing the director to cast her in the film. Featuring alongside Karthi and Tamannaah, Siruthai remains Megha's highest profile work to date. The actress changed her stage name from Megha Nair to Meghna Nair in June 2011, hoping to garner further film offers. Several of her films in the late 2000s and early 2010s were shelved midst production, including Anish's Aadhikkam, Sanjay Ram's Sivamayam opposite Shaam and the female-centric film, Manmadha Rajyam, which saw her work alongside actresses Akshaya, Keerthi Chawla, Sanghavi and Tejashree. 

In 2010, she began appearing in Malayalam films and appeared alongside Suresh Gopi in Ringtone (2010) and Dileep in Mr. Marumakan (2012). She has appeared in a TV Serial titled "Geethanjali" aired on Surya TV.She also participated in "Nestle Munch Stars" which was a celebrity reality show on Asianet.

Filmography

Television
 Nestle Munch Stars (Asianet)
 Geethanjali (Surya TV) as Gowri Parvathy
 Yakshiyum Njanum (Telefilm)

References

External links

Indian film actresses
Actresses in Tamil cinema
Living people
1989 births
Actresses from Alappuzha
Actresses in Malayalam cinema
Actresses in Telugu cinema
21st-century Indian actresses
Actresses in Malayalam television